Manifold Heights is a residential suburb of Geelong.

It was named after Manifolds’ vineyards, that existed between Minerva Road and Shannon Avenue, immediately east of the Geelong Western Cemetery in Herne Hill. The vineyards were owned by the prominent Western District pastoralists, John and Peter Manifold.

The Post Office opened on 25 March 1929, but has always been known as Manifold.

Holy Spirit Church, located in Bostock Avenue, is listed on the Victorian Heritage Register.

References

Suburbs of Geelong